Katalin Hollósy (born February 16, 1950 in Budapest) is a Hungarian sprint canoer who competed in the early 1970s. She won a gold medal in the K-2 500 m event at the 1971 ICF Canoe Sprint World Championships in Belgrade.

Hollósy also finished fourth in the K-2 500 m event at the 1972 Summer Olympics in Munich.

References

1950 births
Canoeists at the 1972 Summer Olympics
Hungarian female canoeists
Living people
Olympic canoeists of Hungary
Canoeists from Budapest
ICF Canoe Sprint World Championships medalists in kayak
20th-century Hungarian women